Ividam Swargamanu is a 2009 Indian Malayalam-language family drama thriller film directed by Rosshan Andrrews and written by James Albert. It was produced by Antony Perumbavoor under the company Aashirvad Cinemas. The film stars Mohanlal, Lalu Alex, Thilakan, Sreenivasan, Shankar and Lakshmi Rai. The music was composed by Gopi Sunder. It tells the story of Mathews, a farmer who has to fight the real estate mafia over selling his farmland which he refuses to give away.

Evidam Swargamanu was released on 25 December 2009. The film won the Kerala State Film Award for Best Film with Popular Appeal and Aesthetic Value.

Plot
The movie "Ividam Swargamanu" narrates the tale of a diligent farmer named Mathews and his struggle against a land mafia that seeks to seize his lands. Hardworking farmers Mathews and his father Jeremias have developed a farm and a cow shed that can house many cattle. Many people are envious of his agricultural land. Together with his father, mother Aleyamma, and her sister Rahelamma, Mathews has had a quiet, contented existence.

Problems arise when Mathews' farm is eyed by Aluva Chandy, a powerful land dealer, who tries to persuade Mathews to sell the land to Chandy so that he may flip it and resell it to a Mumbai-based businessman for a sizable profit. However, Mathews is unwilling to comply to Chandy's demands and complains to the police about Chandy's intrusion into his property. Instead, the policeman works as Chandy's agent, leaving Mathews in a hopeless predicament.

Chandy's false promises, which include establishing a model community, entice the locals to support him. They try to persuade Mathews to sell the property, but he refuses, and the other villagers hate him for it. Mathews and his father are adamant about staying in the community although several of his friends opt to leave by selling their farm. The court appoints a one-man committee to visit, submit, and report after Aluva Chandy fabricates many civil complaints against Mathews and his property. When attorney Sunitha visits the farm, she considers it to be quite satisfactory and provides a report to the court. She gets fired from her team by her senior, acting on Chandy's orders. In order to get Jeremias from being imprisoned, several government agencies are now bringing legal claims against Mathews' farm, including allegations of financial irregularities and failure to return the loan.

A news reporter named Betsy tries to broadcast on her station about the difficulties Mathews is having, but the channel's administrators prevent her from doing so. Sunitha now takes up Mathews' cause, petitions the court on his behalf, and is successful in appointing a "amicus curiae" ("friend of the court") to investigate shady real estate activities in the state. An effective lawyer named Advocate Prabalan is chosen to serve as the "amicus curiae." The remaining portion of the narrative describes how Mathews, with Prabalan's assistance, uncovers the corruption of numerous government agencies and finally wins back his land.

Cast

 Mohanlal as Mathews
 Lalu Alex as Aluva Chandy
 Thilakan as Jeremias
 Sreenivasan as Adv. Prabhalan
 Lakshmi Rai as Adv. Sunitha 
 Shankar as Sudheer
 Kaviyoor Ponnamma as Elsamma Jermias
 Sukumari as Rahelamma
 Baiju Ezhupunna as Joseph
 Sreehari as Thomas, agricultural officer
 Jagathy Sreekumar as Bhuvanendran
 Maniyanpilla Raju as Adv. Jayaraj
 Innocent as Divakara Kaimal, Revenue Secretary
 Priyanka as Betsy Varghese
 Lakshmi Gopalaswamy as Maria 
 Shobha Mohan as Nirmala teacher
 Sadiq as Sudhakaran
 Anoop Chandran as Babu
 Mukundan as Adv. Issac
 Idavela Babu as Peethambaran, village officer
 Babu Namboothiri as Justice Sukumaran Marar
 Manikandan Pattambi as Davis
 T. P. Madhavan as Stephen Edakochi, Tourism Minister
 Lakshmi Priya as Deenamma
 Chembil Ashokan as Charlie
 Geetha Vijayan as District Collector Sindhu Pradeep IAS
 Prem Prakash as Jacob
 Chali Pala as CI Prabhakaran
 Balachandran Chullikkadu as Elias, party leader
 Kunjan as Pappachan, councillor
 Sudheer Karamana as Palkaran Lakshmanan
 Poojappura Radhakrishnan as Abdu, tea shop owner
 Nandhu Podhuval as Raju
 Bindu Murali as Maria's mother
 Omana Ouseph as Shantha, Sunitha's mother
 Manoj Nair as tea shop man
 Pradeep Chandran as Shibu Areekutty
 Assim Jamal as Jayadevan
 Rajesh Sharma as Channel Cameraman
 Meena Ganesh as tea shop owner
 Manjusha Sajish

Production
The film was made on a budget of ₹4 crore.
The crew bought cattle and 15 acres of land to build the farm of protagonist. Vegetable cultivation was initiated 6 months prior to production with instructions from agricultural department.

Soundtrack
Though the movie did not feature any songs, a promotional album was released by Manorama Music. The album features two songs composed by Mohan Sithara, with lyrics by Bichu Thirumala and Kaithapram.

Awards
Kerala State Film Awards
 Best Film with Popular Appeal and Aesthetic Value – Antony Perumbavoor, Rosshan Andrrews

Asianet Film Awards
 Best Actor – Mohanlal
 Best Villain – Lalu Alex
 Most Popular Actress – Lakshmi Rai

Amrita Mathrubhumi Film Awards
 Best Villain – Lalu Alex
 Most Popular Actress – Lakshmi Rai

Atlas State Film Critics Award
 Best Film
 Best Screenplay – James Albert

Vanitha Film Awards
 Most Popular Actor – Mohanlal
 Best Screenplay – James Albert

Kairali TV – World Malayali Council Film Award
 Best Film
 Best Actor – Mohanlal
 Best Director – Rosshan Andrrews

References

External links
 
 Evidam Swargamanu at Oneindia.in
 Review from Nowrunning.com
 Review from sify.com

2009 films
2000s Malayalam-language films
Films directed by Rosshan Andrrews
Aashirvad Cinemas films